There are over 20,000 Grade II* listed buildings in England. This page is a list of these buildings in the district of North Kesteven in Lincolnshire.

North Kesteven

|}

Notes

External links

North Kesteven
 
North Kesteven District